Eshratabad (also Romanized as ‘Eshratābād) is a village in Qasabeh-ye Sharqi Rural District, in the Central District of Sabzevar County, Razavi Khorasan Province, Iran. At the 2006 census, its population was 28, in 10 families.

References 

Populated places in Sabzevar County